The 4733d Air Defense Group is a discontinued United States Air Force organization. Its last assignment was with the 64th Air Division at Frobisher Bay, Baffin Island, Northwest Territories, Canada, where it was discontinued in 1958.  The group was formed in 1957 when ADC assumed responsibility for air defense of Northern Canada from Northeast Air Command, including support for remote Distant Early Warning Line (DEW Line) radar sites.  It also controlled two squadrons operating radars at dispersed locations.  It was discontinued in 1958 and its DEW Line support mission transferred to the 4601st Support Group and its radar squadrons to the 4732d Air Defense Group in Newfoundland.

History
The group was organized in the fall of 1957 at Frobisher Bay by Air Defense Command (ADC) when ADC assumed the mission of Northeast Air Command (NEAC) after NEAC's inactivation. The group was assigned two general surveillance radar squadrons, stationed in the high latitudes of northern Canada, which had been assigned directly to NEAC's 64th Air Division.  The group's mission was to provide detection and reporting of aircraft in the northern portion of North America and to support Distant Early Warning Line (DEW) radar sites.  The group was discontinued in 1958 and the DEW support mission was taken over by 4601st Support Group (DEW), Paramus, New Jersey, while its radar stations were reassigned to the 4732d Air Defense Group at Goose AFB, Labrador.

Lineage
 Designated as the 4733d Air Defense Group and organized on 1 April 1957
 Discontinued on 1 May 1958

Assignments
 64th Air Division, 1 April 1957 – 1 May 1958

Components
 920th Aircraft Control and Warning Squadron
 Resolution Island AS, Northern Territories, Canada, 1 April 1957 – 1 May 1958
 926th Aircraft Control and Warning Squadron
 Frobisher Bay AB, Northwest Territories, Canada, 1 April 1957 – 1 May 1958

Stations
 Frobisher Bay, 1 April 1957 – 1 May 1958

Commander
 Lt Col. Homer E. Chatfield, 1 April 1957 –  1 May 1958

See also
 List of United States Air Force aircraft control and warning squadrons

References

Notes

Bibliography

 
 
 

Aerospace Defense Command units
Four digit groups of the United States Air Force
Air defense groups of the United States Air Force
Military units and formations established in 1957